Johannes Willem du Toit (born 8 September 1995) is a South African rugby union player for the  in Super Rugby and  in the Currie Cup and in the Rugby Challenge. He can play as a flanker or a lock.

Rugby career

2008–2013: Schoolboy rugby

Du Toit was born in Cape Town, but grew up in the nearby Swartland area of the Western Cape. He was selected to represent his local  union at both the Under-13 Craven Week in 2008 and the Under-18 Craven Week in 2013.

2014–2016: Sharks

Springbok coach Jacques Nienaber praised veteran flyhalf Morné Steyn for his notable contribution in the green and gold - on and off the field - over an international career spanning 12 years following his retirement from international rugby on Tuesday.

2017–present: Western Province

At the start of 2017, Du Toit moved to Cape Town, where he joined the  Currie Cup team.

Personal life

Du Toit is the younger brother of Pieter-Steph, also a professional rugby player that represented the n national team since 2013.

References

South African rugby union players
Living people
1995 births
Rugby union players from Cape Town
Rugby union locks
Rugby union flankers
Sharks (Currie Cup) players
Stormers players
Western Province (rugby union) players